The County Championship was a representative competition in rugby league between 1895 and 1983. Throughout the competition history the championship was always contested by Lancashire and Yorkshire and at various times by Cheshire, Cumberland (Cumbria in later years), Durham and Northumberland, Glamorgan and Monmouthshire, and Other Nationalities.  The games between Lancashire and Yorkshire became known as the War of the Roses.

History
When the northern clubs broke away from the Rugby Football Union (RFU) to form the Northern Rugby Football Union (NU) there was already a county championship competition within the RFU and the NU organised a similar competition as one of its first actions with the first fixtures being announced on 17 September 1895, only three weeks after the split from the RFU.

All the constituent clubs of the NU at this point came from just three counties; Cheshire, Lancashire and Yorkshire so the championship was organised to involve sides from these three locations. Players were eligible to play for their county of birth or the county in which they first played.

In the first season the all three teams won one game each so the NU arranged a further round of fixtures so that each county had played the others both home and away. With Lancashire winning both of their second set fixture, they became the first winners of the County Championship.  This was the only season the teams played each other twice. In all subsequent seasons each team only played the others once.

The first change to the structure came in 1898 with the addition of Cumberland to the championship.  Four years (the 1902–1903 season) later a fifth team entered the competition with a team jointly representing Durham and Northumberland playing.  Durham and Northumberland's participation only lasted until the end of the 1903–1904 season when the county union withdrew from the Championship.

The competition continued as a four-team competition for a further two seasons but prior to the start of the 1905–1906 season Cheshire withdrew and effectively merging with Lancashire, the Runcorn club was admitted to the Lancashire League and its players became eligible for selection by Lancashire.

Until the competition was suspended at the outbreak of the First World War, it continued as a triangular competition with the only change being to allow players born in Westmorland to play for Cumberland.

Resuming in the 1919–1920 season there were no changes to the format until the Rugby Football League (RFL) (the NU became the RFL in 1922) admitted a team jointly representing the Welsh counties of Glamorgan and Monmouthshire.  The Welsh side's involvement lasted just four seasons and they dropped out of the Championship after the 1930–1931 season.

From 1931 until 1974 the competition remained a three team affair. Suspended again during the Second World War the competition resumed in 1945 and remained unchanged the 1974–1975 season when an Other Nationalities team competed for two seasons.  Back to three teams from 1976–1977 the competition was last held in the 1982–1983 season when due to declining attendances the competition was abandoned.  The final competition, 1982–1983, was held immediately after the end of the 1981–1982 league season as the fixture calendar for the autumn was congested with fixtures for the visiting Australian team.

During the 1977–1978 season the competition was not held and instead two games (Yorkshire v Cumbria and Lancashire v Yorkshire) were held to raise money for the Queen's Silver Jubilee Fund.

Titles
The title was awarded to the team with the most competition points (2 points for a win, 1 point for a draw). After the 1905–1906 competition ended with Lancashire and Cumberland both on 3-points a play-off game was organised between the two but ended in a 3-all draw so the championship was awarded to both teams.  From then on until the 1950s if two teams finished on the same number of competition points then the title was awarded jointly to both counties and if three teams finished on the same number of competition points, the title was classed as "undecided".

The 1952–1953 season ended with all three teams having won one game each, Lancashire were awarded the title on points average (points scored divided by points conceded). The following season an additional play-off match was arranged between the two teams in the tie with the best points average.  Five titles between 1953–1954 and 1972–1973 were decided in this way.  In 1978-1979 and 1979–1980 both competitions ended in three-way ties but no play-off game was arranged and the title was awarded to the team with the best points difference.

Championships won:

Tables

Results

Statistics

References

Notes

Sources

Rugby league in England
C
Defunct rugby league competitions
1895 establishments in England
1983 disestablishments in England
Rugby league in Wales
Recurring sporting events established in 1895
Recurring sporting events disestablished in 1983